Adele Garrison was the pen name of Nana Belle Springer White (1873 in Clinton Junction, Wisconsin – 1956), an American writer. Her daily newspaper column, a serial story called Revelations of a Wife, ran in multiple American newspapers from 1915 until the Depression.

Biography
Nana Springer White was born in Clinton Junction, Wisconsin. Her career included time as a schoolteacher in Milwaukee. She later worked as an editor for the Milwaukee Sentinel and then a reporter and writer for the Chicago Examiner and the Chicago American. She had one son and one daughter. 

Revelations of a Wife told the story of the marital ups and downs of Margaret "Madge" Graham, an independent-minded former schoolteacher, and her husband Dicky, an artist. At the height of the story's popularity, it had one million regular readers.

References

Sources
 3,000,000 Words, Time magazine, Monday, Mar. 12, 1928
 Undated Wisconsin State Journal article

External links

 
 Revelations of a Wife: the Story of a Honeymoon (columns from 1915 to 1917) at gutenberg, org
 
 

1873 births
1956 deaths
American women short story writers
People from Clinton, Rock County, Wisconsin
Writers from Wisconsin

American short story writers
20th-century pseudonymous writers
Pseudonymous women writers